Rene Minkwitz (born 7 February 1970) is a former strength athlete from Denmark. He won Denmark's Strongest Man 5 times, 2000 - 01 and 2004 - 06, 2 times in 2007 because there were 2 federations in Denmark that year. He finished 10th at the World's Strongest Man final of 1999. He failed to qualify for the final in 2000 and 2002 - 04.

Honours
 5 times Denmark Strongest Man (2000 - 01; 2004 - 06);
 10th place 1999 World's Strongest Man (injured);
 Qualifying heat World's Strongest Man (2000; 2002 - 04);
 2nd place at 2011 Ultimate Strongman Masters World Championship in Belfast, Northern Ireland.

References 

1970 births
Living people
Danish strength athletes